CBC Saskatoon may refer to CBC Saskatoon and SRC Saskatoon stations.

CBC Saskatoon refers to:
CBK-1-FM, CBC Radio One on 94.1 FM, rebroadcasts CBK
CBKS-FM, CBC Radio 2 on 105.5 FM, rebroadcasts CBK-FM
CBKST, CBC Television on channel 11

SRC Saskatoon refers to:
CBKF-2, Première Chaîne on 860 AM, rebroadcasts CBKF-FM
CKSB-2, Espace Musique on 88.7 FM, rebroadcasts CKSB-FM
CBKFT-1, Télévision de Radio-Canada on channel 13, rebroadcasts CBKFT